Ballyea may refer to:

 Ballyea, County Clare
Ballyea GAA, a Gaelic Athletic Association club in the parish of Ballyea/Clarecastle in County Clare, Ireland
Ballyea North, a townland near Ballina in County Tipperary, Ireland
Ballyea, Dorrha, a townland in the extreme north of County Tipperary, Ireland
Ballyea South, a townland near Ballina in Tipperary, Ireland
Ballyea, County Tipperary, a townland in the south of County Tipperary, Ireland